Megatibicen resonans, commonly called Resonant Cicada or Southern pine barrens cicada, is a species of annual cicada in the genus Megatibicen. Prior to its reclassification to the genus Megatibicen, M. resonans was included in the genus Neotibicen.

References

Hemiptera of North America
Cryptotympanini